Milligram per cent is a traditional symbol used to denote a unit of measure of concentration. The traditional use of the 'mg%' symbol was meant to indicate the mass (in milligrams) of that chemical in 100 milliliters of solution (e.g., blood).
The meaning of the symbol 'percent' is 'divided by 100', therefore the accurate meaning of the notation 'mg%' is 'milligrams divided by 100', which is a unit of mass, not a concentration. Therefore, for dimensional analysis purposes, when denoting a concentration of mass divided by volume, it has largely been replaced by units such as 'mg/dL' or the International System of Units equivalent.

For example, a plasma ethanol concentration incorrectly denoted as 0.1 mg% can be written as '0.1 mg/dL' (or '1 mg/L', etc.) meaning a mass of 0.1 milligrams of ethyl alcohol per 100 milliliter volume of plasma.

See also 
 Parts-per-million (ppm)

References

Chemical properties
Physiology
Nephrology
Blood tests